Asprochoma may refer to the following villages in Greece:

Asprochoma, Ioannina, part of the municipality Zitsa
Asprochoma, Messenia, part of the municipality Kalamata
Asprochoma, Larissa, part of the municipality Elassona